Rosemary Hill Observatory (RHO) is an astronomical observatory located near the town of Bronson, Florida (USA), about  southwest of Gainesville, Florida.  The observatory is owned and operated by the University of Florida, and opened in 1967.  It has two telescopes and dormitories for extended observing runs.

Telescopes

 A  Cassegrain reflector was built by Tinsley Laboratories and was commissioned in 1968.  It is occasionally used for instruction, but is primarily used for monitoring active galaxies, performing photometry of transiting exoplanets, and other research purposes.
 The  Ritchey-Chrétien reflector was refurbished in 1994 and is used for instruction.

See also
 Robinson Observatory
 List of astronomical observatories

References

External links
 Department of Astronomy at the University of Florida
 Rosemary Hill Observatory Clear Sky Chart Forecasts of observing conditions.

Astronomical observatories in Florida
University of Florida
Buildings and structures in Levy County, Florida
1967 establishments in Florida